The Sky Open is a men's squash tournament held in Cairo, Egypt. It was part of the PSA World Series in 2009 and 2010, the highest level of men's professional squash competition.

Past Results

References

External links
- SquashSite 2010 website
- PSA Sky Open 2013

Squash tournaments
Squash in Egypt
Recurring sporting events established in 2013